Fort C. F. Smith was a military post established in the Powder River country by the United States Army in Montana Territory on August 12, 1866, during Red Cloud's War. Established by order of Col. Henry B. Carrington, it was one of five forts proposed to protect the Bozeman Trail against the Oglala Lakota (Sioux), who saw the trail as a violation of the 1851 Treaty of Fort Laramie . The fort was abandoned in 1868 and burned by the Sioux under Red Cloud.

History 
The U.S. Army was ordered to build forts to protect the Bozeman trail after travel had become hazardous for any but the largest and best-armed parties. Colonel Henry B. Carrington was given command of the effort, planning Fort C.F. Smith at the crossing of the Bighorn River, Fort Phil Kearny to the east of the Bighorn Mountains, and Fort Reno on the Powder River. A fourth fort on the Clark Fork River was never built.

Originally named Fort Ransom, the post was renamed in commemoration of Gen. Charles Ferguson Smith. It included a 125-foot square stockade made of adobe and wood for protection, with bastions for concentrated defense. Two companies of the 18th Infantry Regiment (approximately 90-100 officers and men) were stationed at Fort Smith during 1866, and during 1867 the garrison consisted of 400 men of the 27th Infantry.

A large Sioux party unsuccessfully attacked haycutters guarded by 20 soldiers near the Fort in the Hayfield Fight in 1867. The Army abandoned Fort C.F. Smith as a condition of the Fort Laramie Treaty of 1868.

The site of the fort is located on private land, on what is today the Crow Indian Reservation.  It is just outside the town of Fort Smith, Montana.  Since most of the fort's buildings were made of adobe, as of 2010 the foundations of the structures can still be seen as low mounds rising a foot or two off the pasture.  By looking carefully, the arrangement of buildings around the perimeter of the old parade ground can be discerned.  A stone monument in the approximate center of the parade ground (placed in the 1930s) commemorates the fort.  A wooden sign, in poor repair, marks the Bozeman Trail.

Fort C.F. Smith was listed on the National Register of Historic Places in 1975.  It is included within Bighorn Canyon National Recreation Area, with  including six contributing sites.

See also 
 List of military installations in Montana

References

Further reading

External links 
 ; and subsequent articles at Bighorn Canyon National Recreation Area

Historic districts on the National Register of Historic Places in Montana
National Register of Historic Places in Bighorn Canyon National Recreation Area
1866 establishments in Montana Territory
C.F.
National Register of Historic Places in Big Horn County, Montana
Red Cloud's War
Bozeman Trail
1868 disestablishments in the United States
Native American history of Montana